Amerikansky Russky Viestnik (1892–1952) was the longest-running Rusyn-American newspaper in the United States.

The paper was the official publication of the Greek Catholic Union of Rusyn Brotherhoods, a fraternal benefit society based in Pennsylvania. Its founding editor was Paul Zatkovich (1892–1914), who was followed by Michael Hanchin (1914–1920), George Jurion Thegze (1920–1929), Father Stefan Varzaly (1929–1936), and Michael Roman (1937–1952).

It was published in both Cyrillic and Roman-alphabet editions. In 1952 it was replaced with the English-language Greek Catholic Union Messenger, which ran until 1992.

References

External links
 Greek Catholic Union of the USA website

Newspapers established in 1892
Publications disestablished in 1952
Rusyn-language newspapers
Rusyn-American culture in Pennsylvania
Rusyn-American history
Slovak-American culture in Pennsylvania
Slovak-language newspapers
1892 establishments in Pennsylvania
1952 disestablishments in Pennsylvania
Rusyn culture